The Quad Cities in the U.S. state of Minnesota are Virginia, Eveleth, Gilbert, and Mountain Iron in the Arrowhead Region, overlapping the Iron Range region, Duluth MN-WI MSA, and Saint Louis County.

U.S. Highway 53, U.S. Highway 169, State Highway 37 (MN 37) and State Highway 135 (MN 135) are four of the main routes in the Quad Cities.

History
The Quad Cities, founded in the 1890s and early 1900s, owe their existence mainly to the mining industry that came to the area around that time. Their prosperity grew as the mines grew. Many of the mines shut down during the Great Depression and didn't resume work until World War II. This was approximately the peak of the industry in the area.

Populations
According to the 2000 census, the Quad Cities have a population of 17,868. Virginia has 9,157 residents, Eveleth 3,865, Mountain Iron 2,999, and Gilbert 1,847.

Economy and industry
The mining industry, long lasting since the early 1900s, is declining in the area, with a new focus on tourism and healthcare.

Things to do
Swimming and shopping are among the activities available in Virginia and its surrounding areas. Swimming and boating are available at many lakes and pits around the Range. The Range has several hiking, biking, and four-wheeling paths. Several snowmobile paths with easy access and ice rinks are also available in the region. The Thunderbird Mall in Virginia, downtown shops in each community, and a Walmart Super Center near the Holiday Inn Express & Suites in Mountain Iron are also options for shopping. The United States Hockey Hall of Fame, a museum celebrating prominent hockey players with history displays and a model rink, is in Eveleth.

References

Source: LaurentianChamber.org -- accessed Nov. 25, 2007

Geography of St. Louis County, Minnesota